The Barddhaman–Rampurhat Express is an Express train belonging to Eastern Railway zone that runs between  and  in India. It is currently being operated with 13013/13014 train numbers on thrice in a week basis.

Service
The 13013/Barddhaman–Rampurhat Express has an average speed of 48 km/hr and covers 112 km in 2h 20m. 13014/Rampurhat–Barddhaman Express has an average speed of 41 km/hr and covers 112 km in 2h 45m.

Route and halts 
The important halts of the train are:

 
 
 Prantik railway station

Coach composition
The train has standard LCF rakes with max speed of 110 kmph. The train consists of 10 coaches:

 8 General
 2 Generators cum Luggage/parcel van

Traction
Both trains are hauled by an Asansol Loco Shed-based WAG-5P electric locomotive from Barddhaman to Rampurhat and vice versa.

Rake sharing
Train shares its rake with 12373/12374 Sealdah–Rampurhat Intercity Express

See also 
 Varanasi Junction railway station
 Mysore Junction railway station
 Sealdah–Rampurhat Intercity Express

Notes

External links 
 13013/Barddhaman - Rampurhat Express
 13014/Rampurhat - Barddhaman Express

References 

Express trains in India
Rail transport in West Bengal
Railway services introduced in 2011